240,715 Russians hold either short- or long-term permits and are currently living in Turkey.

History
Russians began migrating to Turkey during the first half of the 1990s. Most had fled the economic problems prevalent after the dissolution of the Soviet Union. During this period, many intermarried and assimilated with locals, bringing a rapid increase in mixed marriages. There is a Russian Association of Education, Culture and Cooperation, which aims to expand Russian language and culture in Turkey as well as promote the interests of the community.

Following the 2022 Russian invasion of Ukraine, many Russians have fled to Turkey after Vladimir Putin announced a "partial mobilization" of military reservists.

Education
Russian schools:
 Russian Consulate School in Istanbul
 Russian Embassy School in Ankara
 Private International Moscow School in Antalya
 Eduant Private Russian School
 International Russian School in Antalya

See also 
 Russia–Turkey relations
 Turks in Russia

References

Further reading
 

European diaspora in Turkey